James Crall is an American bobsledder who competed in the late 1960s. He won a bronze medal in the two-man event at the 1967 FIBT World Championships in Alpe d'Huez.

External links
Bobsleigh two-man world championship medalists since 1931
Eiskanal bobsleigh world championship listing, men: 1924-2007 

American male bobsledders
Living people
Year of birth missing (living people)